Vappu Linnea Heinonen (1 May 1905, Turku – 10 January 1999) was a Finnish social worker and politician. She was a member of the Parliament of Finland from 1951 to 1962 and from 1966 to 1970, representing first the Social Democratic Party of Finland (SDP), later the Social Democratic Union of Workers and Smallholders (TPSL).

References

1905 births
1999 deaths
People from Turku
People from Turku and Pori Province (Grand Duchy of Finland)
Social Democratic Party of Finland politicians
Social Democratic Union of Workers and Smallholders politicians
Members of the Parliament of Finland (1951–54)
Members of the Parliament of Finland (1954–58)
Members of the Parliament of Finland (1958–62)
Members of the Parliament of Finland (1966–70)
20th-century Finnish women politicians
Women members of the Parliament of Finland